The Pelham Bay Bridge, also known as the Amtrak Hutchinson River Bridge, is a two-track movable railroad bridge that carries the Northeast Corridor (NEC) over the Hutchinson River in the Bronx, New York, upstream from the vehicular/pedestrian Pelham Bridge. It is owned by Amtrak, which provides passenger service, and is used by CSX Transportation and the Providence & Worcester Railroad for freight traffic.

The New York, New Haven and Hartford Railroad completed construction of the bridge in 1907, which originally consisted of three parallel two-track spans. Amtrak partially rehabilitated it in 2009. The lift span is manned and required to open on demand; it does so several times per day for commercial boats.

Amtrak plans to replace the bridge with a new high-level fixed bridge with clearance for maritime traffic. Preliminary work began in 2013. MTA's Metro-North Railroad has proposed the Penn Station Access using the bridge for a so-called Hell Gate Line service which would allow some New Haven Line trains to access New York Penn Station. In January 2019, Amtrak and the MTA reached an agreement regarding Penn Station Access. As part of the deal, the MTA would pay to replace the Pelham Bay Bridge.

See also

Electrification of the New York, New Haven, and Hartford Railroad
Gateway Project (planned NEC expansion and renovation project)
New York Connecting Railroad
Train to the Game

References

Amtrak bridges
Bascule bridges in the United States
Bridges in the Bronx
Bridges completed in 1907
New York, New Haven and Hartford Railroad bridges
Railroad bridges in New York City
Steel bridges in the United States
Concrete bridges in the United States
Warren truss bridges in the United States
Pelham Bay Park